William Mackey may refer to:

 William Mackey (Fenian) (1841–1884), member of the Fenian Brotherhood and the Clan na Gael
 William Mackey (Jesuit) (1915–1995), Canadian Jesuit educationist and founder of the modern educational system of Bhutan
 William F. Mackey (1858–1912), American lawyer and politician from New York
 William Davis Mackey (1913–?), American lawyer and politician from Indiana
 Bill Mackey (1927–1951), American racecar driver

See also
 William Mackie (1799–1860), early Australian settler and judge
 William Mackie (geologist), Scottish geologist
 William C. Mackie, American college football player and coach